Roads Hotel is a historic hotel building located at Atlanta, Hamilton County, Indiana.  It was built in 1893, and is a two-story, rectangular, Queen Anne style frame building.  It measures approximately 36 feet wide by 60 feet deep and features a two-story front porch and cross gable.  The porch features a jigsaw cross gable braces and ornate porch turnings and braces.  It remained in use as a hotel until the 1920s and later converted to apartments.

It was listed on the National Register of Historic Places in 1987.

References

Hotel buildings on the National Register of Historic Places in Indiana
Queen Anne architecture in Indiana
Hotel buildings completed in 1893
Buildings and structures in Hamilton County, Indiana
National Register of Historic Places in Hamilton County, Indiana